Cécile Fatiman (1771-1883), was a Haitian vodou priestess, a mambo. She is famous for her participation in the vodou ceremony at Bois Caïman, which is considered to be one of the starting points of the Haitian Revolution.

Early life and origins
Cécile Fatiman was the daughter of an enslaved African woman and a white Frenchman from Corsica. She and her mother were sold as slaves at Saint Domingue, while her two brothers disappeared in the slave trade. She is described as having long silky hair and green eyes.

Haitian researcher Rodney Salnave (Bwa Kay Il-Ment) has researched Fatiman's origins. His research has indicated that her father was likely a Corsican prince and a grandson of Theodore Von Neuhoff or Theodore of Corsica, sole king of Corsica.  He also believes that her last name, Fatiman, may actually have been a middle name, Attiman, which would have been given after Gregorio Attiman, of Leghorn or Livorno, Italy, who was one of Theodore Neuhoff's pages during his conquest of the Corsican throne in April 1736. This prompted him to state that her full name was most likely Cécile Attiman Coidavid, as she was the daughter of Célestina Coidavid, and the sister of Marie-Louise Coidavid, Queen of Haiti from 1811 to 1820. She was the mother-in-law of  Pierre Nord Alexis.

Slave rebellion 
In August 1791, Fatiman presided over a ceremony at the Bois Caïman in the role of mambo together with priest Dutty Boukman. Boukman prophesied that the slaves Jean François, Biassou, and Jeannot would be leaders of a resistance movement and revolt that would free the slaves of Saint-Domingue. An animal was sacrificed, an oath was taken, and Boukman and the priestess exhorted the listeners to take revenge against their French oppressors and "[c]ast aside the image of the God of the oppressors."  According to the Encyclopedia of African Religion: "Blood from the animal, and some say from humans as well, was given in a drink to the attendees to seal their fates in loyalty to the cause of liberation of Sainte-Domingue." During the ceremony, Cécile Fatiman was possessed by Erzulie Dantor. She was also said to have cut the throat of a pig and offered its blood to the spectators.  
A week later, 1800 plantations had been destroyed and 1000 slaveholders killed.

Later life 
Fatiman was married to Louis Michel Pierrot, a general in the Haitian revolutionary army and later president. She is reported to have lived to the age of 112.

References

1771 births
1883 deaths
Haitian independence activists
Women in 19th-century warfare
Women in war in the Caribbean
Women of the Haitian Revolution
Haitian Vodou practitioners
First ladies and gentlemen of Haiti
People of Saint-Domingue
Haitian people of French descent
Longevity claims